Elections to Newcastle City Council were held on 4 May 2006. One third of the council was up for election, with each successful candidate to serve a four-year term of office, expiring in 2010. The council stayed under Liberal Democrat control, with the party gaining one seat overall.

Election result

Ward results

Benwell and Scotswood

Blakelaw

Byker

Castle

Dene

Denton

East Gosforth

Elswick

Fawdon

Fenham

Kenton

Lemington

Newburn

North Heaton

North Jesmond

Ouseburn

Parklands

South Heaton

South Jesmond

Walker

Walkergate

West Gosforth

Westerhope

Westgate

Wingrove

Woolsington

References

Newcastle City Council elections
Newcastle